Charles Muturi is an Anglican bishop in Kenya: he was the Suffragan Bishop of Mount Kenya South from 2010 to 2019 when he was elected the diocesan.

References

21st-century Anglican bishops of the Anglican Church of Kenya
Anglican bishops of Mount Kenya South
Year of birth missing (living people)
Living people